is a skiing area located in Nagano, Nagano, Japan. It is operated by Nagano City.

Constructed on existing alpine skiing runs, it hosted the freestyle skiing events for the 1998 Winter Olympics. The venue was a temporary one for those games.

The resort has steadily declined in popularity and closed in March, 2020 due to insufficient ski numbers and lack of snow fall. The prefecture has offered the resort for free to interested parties if they take on the business liabilities.

References

1998 Winter Olympics official report. Volume 2. pp. 206–8.
Myokokogen.net profile

Venues of the 1998 Winter Olympics
Olympic freestyle skiing venues
Defunct sports venues in Japan
Ski areas and resorts in Japan
Sports venues in Nagano Prefecture
Sport in Nagano (city)